Paepalanthus celsus is a species of plant in the Eriocaulaceae family. It is endemic to Ecuador.  Its natural habitats are subtropical or tropical moist montane forests and subtropical or tropical high-altitude shrubland.

References

Eriocaulaceae
Endemic flora of Ecuador
Least concern plants
Taxonomy articles created by Polbot